Bolbocerastes is a genus of earth-boring scarab beetles in the family Bolboceratidae. There are at least four described species in Bolbocerastes.

Species
These four species belong to the genus Bolbocerastes:
 Bolbocerastes imperialis Cartwright, 1953
 Bolbocerastes peninsularis (Schaeffer, 1906)
 Bolbocerastes regalis Cartwright, 1953
 Bolbocerastes serratus (LeConte, 1854)

References

Further reading

 
 

Bolboceratidae
Articles created by Qbugbot